Be Your Age is a 1926 American film starring Charley Chase and features Oliver Hardy in the cast.

Plot
A man desperately need $10,000 to send home to his family. There is a woman who is a widow, and has just inherited two million dollars from her husband. She wants to remarry as soon as possible. The woman's lawyer is a conniving man who happens to have a solution for both of them.

Cast
 Charley Chase as Charley, the Bashful Clerk
 Gladys Hulette as The Widow's Secretary
 Lillian Leighton as Mrs. Schwartzkopple
 Frank Brownlee as Mr. Blaylock
 Oliver Hardy as Oswald Schwartzkopple

See also
 List of American films of 1926

References

External links

1926 films
American silent short films
1926 short films
American black-and-white films
Silent American comedy films
American comedy short films
1926 comedy films
1920s American films